Christopher Dorst (born June 5, 1956) is an American former water polo player who won a silver medal for the United States at the 1984 Summer Olympics in Los Angeles, California. He was slated to go with the US Olympic Team to the 1980 Summer Olympics where they were the favorites for winning the gold medal, but the team ended up not competing because of the US boycott of the Olympics that year.

He is a graduate of Stanford University and Menlo-Atherton High School and is a member of the Stanford Athletic Hall of Fame and the USA Water Polo Hall of Fame.

He is married to former Stanford swimmer Marybeth Linzmeier.

See also
 List of Olympic medalists in water polo (men)
 List of men's Olympic water polo tournament goalkeepers

References

External links
 

1956 births
Living people
American male water polo players
Water polo goalkeepers
Olympic silver medalists for the United States in water polo
Water polo players at the 1984 Summer Olympics
Medalists at the 1984 Summer Olympics
Stanford Cardinal men's water polo players
Place of birth missing (living people)